Streptomyces heliomycini is a bacterium species from the genus of Streptomyces which has been isolated from soil. Streptomyces heliomycini produces heliomycin.

See also 
 List of Streptomyces species

References

Further reading

External links
Type strain of Streptomyces heliomycini at BacDive -  the Bacterial Diversity Metadatabase

heliomycini
Bacteria described in 1986